The Parish of Weltevreden Park is represented solely by St. Michael and All Angels' Anglican Church. It is located at 1123 Cornelius Street.

The Parish of Weltevreden Park is a parish of the Anglican Diocese of Johannesburg, part of  the Anglican Church of Southern Africa. Weltevreden Park is one of the western suburbs of Johannesburg.

References

External links 

Anglican church buildings in South Africa
Churches in Johannesburg